Umurata is a mountain in the Andes, about 5,717 m (18,757 ft) high, situated in the Cordillera Occidental on the border of Bolivia and Chile. It is located in the Arica and Parinacota Region of Chile and in the Oruro Department of Bolivia, in the Sajama Province, Turku Municipality, Chachakumani Canton. Umurata lies south of the Uqi Uqini volcano, north of the Acotango and north-east of the Wallatiri volcano. Argon-argon dating has yielded ages of 970,000±120,000 for Umurata rocks. Umurata is situated south of National Route 4 near the Chungara-Tambo Quemado pass.

See also
 Capurata
 List of mountains in the Andes

References 

Mountains of Chile
Landforms of Arica y Parinacota Region
Mountains of Oruro Department
International mountains of South America
Bolivia–Chile border
Five-thousanders of the Andes